Joshua Misiewicz (born June 25, 1988) is an American ice sled hockey player. He was a member of the gold medal-winning US team at the 2018 and 2022 Winter Paralympics. He was wounded in action while serving as a United States Marine Corps in the War in Afghanistan.

He played hockey for Saint Mary's University of Minnesota, Winona, Minnesota.

References

External links

1988 births
Living people
American amputees
American sledge hockey players
Paralympic sledge hockey players of the United States
Paralympic gold medalists for the United States
Para ice hockey players at the 2018 Winter Paralympics
Para ice hockey players at the 2022 Winter Paralympics
Medalists at the 2018 Winter Paralympics
Medalists at the 2022 Winter Paralympics
Ice hockey players from Illinois
People from Berwyn, Illinois
Paralympic medalists in sledge hockey
Saint Mary's University of Minnesota alumni
United States Marine Corps personnel of the War in Afghanistan (2001–2021)
United States Marines